Ferenc Temlin, known in Slovenian as Franc Temlin, was a Slovenian Lutheran pastor in the Kingdom of Hungary in the 18th century.
 
Temlin was born in the village of Krajna (Hung. Véghely) in the Prekmurje region of the Kingdom of Hungary. The exact date of his birth is unknown. He wrote the first book in the Prekmurje dialect. This was Mali katechismus ("Small Catechism"), published in the German town of Halle in 1715.

See also 
 List of Slovene writers and poets in Hungary

Slovenian writers and poets in Hungary
17th-century births
18th-century deaths
Slovenian Lutheran clergy
Hungarian Lutheran clergy
People from the Municipality of Tišina